American R&B singer-songwriter Keke Palmer has released two studio albums, three extended plays, three mixtapes and 28 singles. In 2005, she signed a record deal with Atlantic Records. Palmer released her debut album So Uncool on September 18, 2007. The album failed to chart on the US Billboard 200, but did chart at number 85 on the R&B chart. The album was preceded by the second single "Keep It Movin'". In 2010, Palmer was signed by the Chairman of Interscope Records, Jimmy Iovine, and began working on an album.

In January 2011, Palmer released her first mixtape Awaken. The mixtape was officially released on January 10, 2011, for downloading from mixtape-downloading websites. The first and only single released from the mixtape was "The One You Call". A music video was also released for the song. In July 2012, Palmer released the single "You Got Me" featuring Kevin McCall. The video for the single was released on July 11, 2012. Palmer released a self-titled mixtape Keke Palmer on October 1, 2012. It included her previously released singles "You Got Me" and "Dance Alone".

Albums

Studio albums

Mixtapes

Reissue albums

Compilation albums

Extended plays

Singles

As lead artist

As featured artist

Promotional singles

Other charted songs

Other appearances

Music videos
Main artist

Guest appearances

Notes
Notes

References

Rhythm and blues discographies
Pop music discographies
Discographies of American artists